Mario Augusto Gomez Urbina (born 27 May 1981 in Callao) is a footballer from Peru who plays for Sport Boys.

In April 2010 he was arrested by police after being accused of shooting a 17-year-old man.  After 73 days in prison he was released on July 7 of that same year returning to the Sport Boys.

International career
He is also a former member of Peru national football team.

References

External links
 
 
 
 News about imprisonment - Goal.com  

1981 births
Living people
Sportspeople from Callao
Peruvian footballers
Peru international footballers
Club Universitario de Deportes footballers
Sport Áncash footballers
Club Deportivo Universidad de San Martín de Porres players
Sport Boys footballers
Juan Aurich footballers
Cienciano footballers
Association football midfielders